Hough is a village (at ) and civil parish in the unitary authority of Cheshire East and the ceremonial county of Cheshire, England. The parish also includes part of the settlement of Goodalls Corner. The total population is a little over 800, measured at 808 in the 2011 Census. Nearby villages include Basford, Chorlton, Shavington, Weston and Wybunbury.

Governance
Hough is administered by Hough & Chorlton Parish Council jointly with the adjacent parish of Chorlton. From 1974 the civil parish was served by Crewe and Nantwich Borough Council, which was succeeded on 1 April 2009 by the new unitary authority of Cheshire East. Hough falls in the parliamentary constituency of Crewe and Nantwich, which has been represented by Kieran Mullan since 2019, after being represented by Laura Smith (2017–19), Edward Timpson (2008–17) and Gwyneth Dunwoody (1983–2008).

Geography and transport

Outside Hough village, the parish is predominantly rural, with the major land use being agricultural. Swill Brook runs along parts of the eastern boundary of the parish, and an unnamed tributary forms part of the southern boundary. Numerous small meres and ponds are scattered across the area. Several small areas of woodland fall within the parish, including Cobb's Moss and Hough Gates. To the east of Cobb's Lane, south of Hough village, lies Hough Common, an area of common land designated as a county site of biological importance (grade B).

Newcastle Road (the old A500) runs east–west at the north of the parish. Cobb's Lane runs north–south through the parish, joining Newcastle Road just to the north-east of the parish boundary in Chorlton. Pit Lane connects Newcastle Road and Cobb's Lane, forming a triangle in which Hough village is located. The B5071 (Stock Lane) forms a short stretch of the western boundary of the parish; it runs from Newcastle Road through Wybunbury. Wrinehill Road connects the B5071 with Cobb's Lane, forming part of the southern parish boundary. The A500 formerly ran through the parish, but now has been diverted to bypass it to the north.

The National Cycle Network Route 70 follows Cobb's Lane. Two major public footpaths cross the parish: the South Cheshire Way runs north–south and the Crewe and Nantwich Circular Walk runs east–west. The Crewe–Stafford railway line runs north–south through Chorlton, immediately to the east of the parish.

Demography
According to the 2001 census, the parish had a population of 783, in 326 households. The population has more than doubled since 1951; the historical population figures were 206 (1801), 309 (1851), 324 (1901) and 330 (1951).

Landmarks

Hough Hall is a red-brick house dating originally from the 17th century; both the house and its wrought-iron entrance gates, which date from the early 18th century, are listed at grade II*. Hough Manor is a grade-II-listed, red-brick country house dating from the mid-18th century. The Cliffe is a grade-II-listed house in brick with fake timber framing, dating from the mid-to-late 19th century.

Hough village has a public house, the White Hart, and a Primitive Methodist Chapel which is now closed and is to become part of the Englesea Brook Museum.

Education

There are no educational facilities in Hough. The civil parish falls within the catchment areas of Shavington Primary School in Shavington cum Gresty and Shavington High School in Rope.

See also

Listed buildings in Hough, Cheshire

References

External links

Civil parishes in Cheshire
Villages in Cheshire